The 65th Brigade was a formation of  the British Army. It was raised as part of the new army also known as Kitchener's Army and assigned to the 22nd Division and served on the Western Front and the Macedonian Front during the First World War.

Formation
The infantry battalions did not all serve at once, but all were assigned to the brigade during the war.

14th Battalion, King's (Liverpool Regiment)
12th Battalion, Lancashire Fusiliers
9th Battalion, East Lancashire Regiment
8th Battalion, South Wales Borderers 
65th Machine Gun Company 
65th SAA Section Ammunition Column 
65th Trench Mortar Battery

References

Infantry brigades of the British Army in World War I